The University of Mohaghegh Ardabili (UMA) (also written "Ardebili"), and known as Mohaghegh Ardabili University, is a public university in Ardabil province, Iran. It is named in honor of Allama Mohaghegh Arbabili.

The university was established in 1978 as a college of agriculture (آموزشکده کشاورزی) under the supervision of Tabriz University. It became a separate, independent university in 1996.

Mohaghegh Ardabili offers a full range of undergraduate and graduate programs. With more than 11,000 students and 395 full-time faculty members, Mohaghegh Ardabili University is one of the fastest-growing universities in Iran. It has 11 faculties, 3 research centers, and 11 research groups. , the university admits students in 273 fields in 11 faculties, which 61 of them are doctoral candidates, 128 are master's students and the rest are undergraduate students.

Gallery

See also
Higher education in Iran
List of universities in Iran

External links

University of Mohaghegh Ardabili
Education in Ardabil Province
Educational institutions established in 1978
Buildings and structures in Ardabil